Portes is a Greek fishing village located on the east side of Aegina. The inhabitants of the village live mainly on fishing and tourism. The landscape and the wild beauty attracts visitors.

It is said that Portes suffered from the activities of the Ottoman pirate Barbarossa, so they built houses without windows, only with doors (portes or πόρτες in Greek) which is the origin of the name of the village. A second explanation is that the name Portes comes from the word porto (i.e. port) since the village has a port from which volcanic material, named Mavropetres, were loaded into ships that sailed to Crete.

There are fishing areas at Kavos Antoni. The area is ideal for scuba diving and underwater spearfishing.

External links
 Portes Beach
 Greek Islands - Aegina
 The villages and areas of Aegina island.

Populated places in Islands (regional unit)
Aegina